Paul A. Flanagan is the State Deputy of Massachusetts in the Knights of Columbus. His father, Newman A. Flanagan, and grandfather James H. Flanagan, were also state deputies. They are the only grandfather-father-son combination of state deputies in the history of the Knights of Columbus. 

On July 10, 2018, he was honored at Fenway Park during the pregame ceremony for a Boston Red Sox game. He is a member of San Salvador number 200 in Stoughton, Massachusetts.

References

Works cited

 

Living people
Year of birth missing (living people)